Electric Loco Shed, Valsad is an electric engine shed located in Valsad, in the Indian state of Gujarat. It is located to south of Valsad railway station, it falls under the Mumbai WR railway division of Western Railway. It is the largest of locomotive sheds in the Western Railway zone.

History 

It was established in the 1970s specifically to home dual-power locos. It holds more than 50 WAG-5 class locomotives. Post AC conversion of Western Railway, few WAG-5, and all WCAM-2 fleet were transferred to Central Railway's Kalyan Loco Shed. WCAM-1 were slowly condemned. The shed received WAG-7 in 2013.

The shed houses over 100 electric locomotives. It is the only loco shed on WR which had housed the AC/DC locomotives like WCAM-1 and WCAM-2, WCAM-2P and one of the only two in India; the other being Kalyan Loco Shed on Central Railway to house AC/DC dual powered electric locomotives.  Recently many WAG-5/5As have been homed at Valsad which are pure AC locomotives.

Locomotives

References

External links 
 Railway Board – Official Website
 Western Railway – Official Website

Valsad
Valsad
Valsad
Transport in Valsad
1970 establishments in Gujarat
Year of establishment missing